Rielle Hunter (born Lisa Jo Druck; March 20, 1964, also known as Lisa Hunter, Lisa Jo Hunter, and Rielle Jaya James Druck) is an American former film producer. She is known for having had an affair with, and a child by, former U.S. Senator John Edwards, while he was a contender for the Democratic presidential nomination in 2008. She is said to be the basis of a character in a Jay McInerney novel.

Early life
Hunter was born in Fort Lauderdale, Florida. Her parents, James Druck (1934–1990) and Gwen Druck, owned Eagle Nest Farm in Ocala, Florida, where they raised show horses. They had four daughters. James Druck was a wealthy lawyer, who specialized in defending insurance companies.

Hunter went to St. John Lutheran School and North Marion High School in Ocala. After high school, Hunter attended the University of Tampa, but she transferred after two years to the University of Florida. In her junior year she withdrew from the University of Florida to move to New York City to pursue an acting career.

Horse killings and Henry the Hawk

According to ABC News, Lisa Druck was a prize-winning equestrian when her father was implicated in the "horse murders" scandal, "an ugly plot to electrocute horses for insurance money". The convicted criminal and FBI informant Tommy "The Sandman" Burns stated that James Druck was involved in the 1982 insurance fraud death of Lisa's show jumper horse Henry the Hawk. Gwen and James Druck divorced that same year; Lisa was 17 years old at the time. James Druck was never charged, and he died of cancer in New York City in 1990.

Literary inspiration
"Brat Pack" novelist Jay McInerney said that Hunter, his former girlfriend, is the basis for the lead character Alison Poole in the 1988 novel Story of My Life. McInerney described their relationship and Hunter's role as the inspiration for the character in an interview in 2005.  McInerney also said that he chose to write about her and her friends because he was both "intrigued and appalled" by their behavior.

McInerney's friend and fellow Brat Pack author Bret Easton Ellis also includes the character Alison Poole in two of his novels, Glamorama and American Psycho.

There was open speculation that Story of My Life was a roman à clef novel when it first appeared; to New York Magazine'''s questions "Is it real? Did it happen?"  McInerney replied, "I'm anticipating some of that kind of speculation, but I'm utterly confident of not having any lawsuits on my hands. The book is a fully imagined work of fiction. On the other hand, it's not to say that I didn't make use of [pause] … That's why I live in New York. Mine is not an autonomous imagination."

In 2008, McInerney incorporated the John Edwards affair into the Allison Poole follow-up story "Penelope on the Pond" in his collections The Last Bachelor and How It Ended.

Marriage and name change
Druck married attorney Alexander M. "Kip" Hunter III (born April 14, 1959) in Cabo San Lucas, Mexico, on August 3, 1991, and they moved from New York to establish a new home in Beverly Hills, California.  She changed her name to Rielle Hunter in 1994.Woman in Edwards Affair Will Not Allow DNA Test, August 9, 2008, New York Times

Rielle Hunter filed for divorce in October 1999, which was finalized September 1, 2000.

Acting, film, and video career
During the 1980s and 1990s, as Lisa Hunter and Lisa Jo Hunter, she appeared in several films, most notably Overboard (1987) and Ricochet (1991) in which she portrayed a reporter.

According to People, during this same period, while she was married to Alexander Hunter, her husband "financed the production of a play for her — a coming-of-age story about a group of tough 30-something New Yorkers [...] titled Savage in Limbo," which co-starred Elizabeth Dennehy.

In 2000, as Rielle Hunter, she wrote, acted in, and produced a comedy short called Billy Bob and Them, which starred Wolfgang Bodison. At that time her production company was called R Hunter Films.

In 2002, Hunter appeared as a contestant on the GSN series Lingo (episode #1061, hosted by Chuck Woolery), on which she and her partner together won $500.

Midline Groove Productions
In 2006, Hunter pitched the idea of a series of short informal campaign videos to Democrat John Edwards when she met him at a bar in New York City, where he was attending a business meeting. The Edwards campaign soon hired her to produce a series of promotional videos portraying behind-the-scenes life on the campaign trail and Hunter filmed and produced four of these short videos for the 2008 presidential campaign of John Edwards.

In July 2006, Hunter formed the production company Midline Groove Productions LLC with her partner Mimi Godfrey Hockman. This company, which was based in South Orange, New Jersey, produced campaign promotional videos for Edwards. The series of ads, "Inspiring Politics: A Webisode Series Following John Edwards," was broadcast on the Internet rather than through conventional television. According to the Associated Press, Edwards' One America Committee paid Midline Groove Productions $100,000 on July 6, 2006, five days after Hunter incorporated the firm in Delaware. The committee later made two subsequent payments totaling $14,461, the final one on April 1, 2007. In all, Midline Groove filmed and produced four of these short videos; the shortest was 2½ minutes long.

Hunter's videos were uploaded to YouTube. Recognition of the innovative nature of the series was given by BusinessWeek magazine, which included one of the episodes in a 2006 feature on new developments in Web video. Catherine Holoran, writing for the magazine, noted that the Hunter videos had effectively announced the presidential candidacy of Edwards ten days before he released the information to the mainstream media. Holoran stated that Hunter's series marked a "tipping point" in the history of web video which "sent the message that online video is a serious medium, ready to contend with traditional media for audiences and ad dollars." In 2008, Maria Russo, the reviewer of websites for the Los Angeles Times, also mentioned that Hunter had been among the earliest adopters of YouTube for viral marketing purposes, and was the first filmmaker who exploited that venue for political campaign marketing.

Involvement with John EdwardsThe National Enquirer, a U.S. tabloid, cited claims by an anonymous source that Edwards had engaged in an extramarital affair with Hunter during Edwards's 2008 presidential campaign and that Hunter was pregnant. After a report by the National Enquirer on December 19, 2007, Hunter announced she was pregnant with the child of Andrew Young, a married man who is a former staffer for John Edwards' presidential campaign.  Young, his wife Cheri, and their young children were living outside of Chapel Hill, North Carolina, at the time in the same "Governor's Club" complex where Hunter was renting. Soon afterward, the Youngs and Hunter moved to California.

Hunter became pregnant with Edwards' child in May 2007; she later said she found out she was pregnant only in July. She gave birth to her daughter on February 27, 2008, in Santa Barbara, California, but did not list the child's father's name on the birth certificate. She gave her own name as "Rielle Jaya James Druck" on her daughter's birth certificate, but gave the child the surname "Hunter".

In July 2008, The National Enquirer said Edwards was the father of Hunter's child.
On August 8, Edwards admitted the affair, but denied that he was the father of Hunter's child and stated that he was willing to take a paternity test. The Washington Post reported that Robert Gordon (Hunter's attorney) stated that she had refused to allow a DNA test to establish paternity "now or in the future." However, Hunter's sister publicly asked Edwards to take a paternity test to determine whether the child was his.

On August 12, 2008, Hunter's friend Pigeon O'Brien told CBS News that Edwards had lied about the timeline of the affair.  She said the affair began in February 2006, six months before Edwards hired Hunter, and said the affair was not a brief liaison, but rather was allegedly characterized by Edwards to Hunter as a committed relationship. On August 13, 2008, Hunter's sister, Roxanne Druck Marshall, personally apologized to John Edwards's wife Elizabeth for her sister's behavior. She said Edwards had lied in his confession because, she said, the affair had been ongoing.

On January 21, 2010, Edwards admitted publicly that he is the father of Hunter's daughter Quinn.

On June 26, 2012 Hunter's book, What Really Happened: John Edwards, Our Daughter and Me, was released through a Dallas-based boutique publisher, BenBella Books. The same day, Hunter stated that her relationship with Edwards had broken up.

On February 9, 2016, Hunter spoke on Steve Harvey'' in her first televised interview in almost five years, and stated they were still dating until February of 2015.

References

External links

1964 births
20th-century American actresses
Actresses from Fort Lauderdale, Florida
American film producers
Florida Democrats
John Edwards
Mistresses
Living people
University of Florida alumni
University of Tampa alumni
American women film producers